FinanceWorks is an online financial management application developed by Digital Insight, the financial institution division of NCR Corporation, and is offered to consumers through their bank or credit union website. FinanceWorks is similar to Mint.com; both are online financial programs owned by Intuit.  FinanceWorks allows consumers to manage financial accounts at multiple financial institutions from within their current bank or credit union's online banking site.

Awards
Javelin Strategy & Research: "Best in class" for online financial management  "[FinanceWorks] sets the standard for rivals to match.… One would expect an Intuit company to excel at providing user-friendly, practical personal finance management tools — and Digital Insight does not disappoint."
BankInnovation.net: "Best Technology" winner in BankInnovation Awards of 2009.

Missing features
FinanceWorks does not offer the ability to import transactions, create subcategories, pay bills, transfer money, or reconcile accounts.

References

External links
Company home page
FinanceWorks and Small Business FinanceWorks product site
Brochure
Example implementation service summary at goldenpacificbank.com

Accounting software
Account aggregation providers
Intuit software